Asot Michael is an Antiguan politician and a Member of the Parliament of Antigua and Barbuda, elected from Saint Peter Constituency. He was also the Minister of Tourism, Economic Development, Investment and Energy under Prime Minister Gaston Browne. He was formerly a member of the Antigua and Barbuda Labour Party.

Early life and education

Asot Michael was born in Guadeloupe, French West Indies, in December 1969, in an economic and political Antiguan family. His grandfather Asot A. Michael and his father Patrick Michael were business people supporting the ruling Antigua and Barbuda Labour Party. He attended St. Joseph's Academy, St. John's, Antigua from 1982 to 1986 for his secondary education. Michael obtained a BS in business administration from Barry University (Miami Shores, Florida) in 1989, and an MBA from the University of Miami in 1991.

After completing his studies, Michael returned to Antigua to work at Asot's Arcade, a family business named for his late grandfather.

Political career
In 1995, Michael began his first job in government as the Special Administrative Assistant to then-Prime Minister Lester Bird, and was eventually appointed Bird's Chief of Staff in 1997. After that, Michael was appointed a Government Senator in 1999 as well as Minister of State in the office of the Prime Minister, overseeing responsibilities for Public Works, Communications, Insurance, Energy and St. John's Development Corporation. He continued in that role until 2001 he then became a full minister responsible for these portfolios until 2003. Also, In 2001 he was appointed Junior Minister of Finance until 2003. From 1999 to 2003, Michael served as Leader of Government Business in the Senate.

Michael was first elected to the House of Representatives for the constituency of Saint Peter in 2004. He belonged to the Antigua Labour Party during his elections of 2004 and 2009, until the party transitioned to the Antigua and Barbuda Labour Party when he was re-elected in 2014 and 2018.

In 2016, the Caribbean Journal awarded Michael with the Best Tourism Minister Award for the entire Caribbean.

On 23 October 2017, he was detained at Heathrow Airport while in transit to a citizenship by investment conference in France, being accused of having requested bribes from a British investor in 2016. While being interviewed by U.K. authorities, Prime Minister Gaston Browne removed him as Minister of Tourism, Economic Development, Investment and Energy despite Michael denying any wrongdoing.

Michael was reelected in March 2018 garnering 78 percent of votes and assigned the portfolio of Investment and Trade by Prime Minister Gaston Browne.

In 2018, Michael was accused by British investor Peter Virdee of Michael's involvement in a bribery scheme. Michael denied soliciting bribes and said the original detention was for the purpose of an interview with police. Following the resignation, Prime Minister Gaston Browne said, "Unfortunately, [Michael] has a legal issue he has to dispense [with] and as soon as he is able to do so we look forward to his return to the government to make his contribution." Michael resigned his position on 15 May 2018.

Michael returned as an MP in 2018, and served in his role as Minister of Investment and Trade. In 2019, Prime Minister Gaston Browne stated that, "Michael was not only a great asset to the government and the Antigua Barbuda Labour Party (ABLP) but that he had also made tremendous contributions to Antigua and Barbuda."

References

Antigua and Barbuda Labour Party politicians
Antigua and Barbuda businesspeople
Government ministers of Antigua and Barbuda
Tourism ministers
Energy ministers
Members of the House of Representatives (Antigua and Barbuda)
Barry University alumni
University of Miami Business School alumni
1969 births
Antigua and Barbuda people of British descent
Living people